Magna Carta Records is an independent record label located in Rochester, New York. Magna Carta was formed in 1989 and is owned by Peter Morticelli and his partner Mike Varney. The label, named for the 1215 English document advancing democracy, Magna Carta, has a diverse line-up consisting of musicians from many different genres, but is best known for many of its progressive rock/metal acts. Among the artists featured on the label are OHMphrey, Alex Skolnick Trio, Dave Martone, Kris Norris, and Doug Pinnick (of King's X).

Distribution
As of June 1, 2009, Magna Carta began working with Alternative Distribution Alliance for North American distribution.  Magna Carta formerly worked with Rykodisc which was acquired by ADA in early 2009.  ADA is a subsidiary of Warner Music Group (WMG).

Magna Carta is distributed by Plastic Head in the UK and by Border Music in Scandinavia.

In June 2018, Magna Carta put its royalties and copyrights up for sale on the music auction site Royalty Exchange. The label had earned $104,000 in the past 12 months and sold for $570,000.

Roster

Magna Carta

Alex Skolnick Trio
Bill Cutler
Dave Martone
Doug Pinnick
Ethan Brosh
Jordan Rudess
Kris Norris
Lief Sorbye

Michael Lee Firkins
MoeTar
OHMphrey
Oz Noy
Points North
Royal Hunt
Steve Stevens
Tempest

Past

Age of Nemesis
Altura
 The Android Meme
Andy West with Rama
Anthropia
Attention Deficit
Billy Sheehan
Bozzio
Bozzio Sheehan
Bozzio/Levin/Stevens
Cairo
Caliban
Clinton Administration
Dali's Dilemma
David Lee Roth
December People
Derdian
Derek Sherinian
Enchant
Explorers Club
The Fareed Haque Group
The Hideous Sun Demons
Ice Age
James LaBrie
James LaBrie's Mullmuzzler
Kansas
Khallice
Lemur Voice

Leonardo
Liquid Tension Experiment
Liquid Trio Experiment
The Lonely Bears
Magellan
Mike Portnoy
Niacin
Ozric Tentacles
Robert Berry
Robert Walter
Sadus
School Of The Arts
Shadow Gallery
Simon Phillips
Speakers For The Dead
Steve Morse
Steve Walsh
Stripsearch
Tiles
Tishamingo
Tony Levin
Tony Hymas
Totalasti
Under The Sun
Vapourspace
World Trade

Tribute albums

Tribute to ELP - "Encores, Legends & Paradox" (1999)
Tribute to Genesis - "Supper's Ready" (1995)
Tribute to Jethro Tull - "To Cry You A Song" (1996)
Tribute to Pink Floyd - "The Moon Revisited" (1995)
Tribute to Yes - "Tales From Yesterday" (1995)

Tribute to Rush - "Working Man" (1996)
Tribute to Rush - "Subdivisions" (2005)
Tribute to Rush - (2009)
Tribute to the Titans - Compilation of Magna Carta Tribute Albums (1999)

Special projects

Guitars That Ate My Brain (2009)
Drum Nation Volume III (2006)
Drum Nation Volume II (2005)
Drum Nation Volume I (2004)
Guitar Greats Volume I (2007)

Guitar Greats Volume II (2008)
Steinway To Heaven (1996)
A Soundtrack for the Wheel of Time (2001)

See also
 List of record labels

References

External links
 Official Website
 Official Website - Artists Page

American record labels
Rock record labels
Progressive rock record labels
Heavy metal record labels
Labels distributed by Warner Music Group